The Imperial Edict of the Abdication of the Qing Emperor (lit. "Xuantong Emperor's Abdication Edict") was an official decree issued by the Empress Dowager Longyu on behalf of the six-year-old Xuantong Emperor, the last emperor of the Qing dynasty of China, on 12 February 1912, as a response to the Xinhai Revolution. The revolution led to the self-declared independence of 13 southern Chinese provinces and the subsequent peace negotiation between the rest of Qing China and the collective of the southern provinces.

The issuance of the Imperial Edict marked the end of the 276-year rule of the Qing dynasty, and the era of Chinese imperial rule, which lasted 2,132 years. Furthermore, the Imperial Edict established the Republic of China as the sole successor state to the Qing dynasty and provided the legal basis for the Republic of China to inherit all Qing territories, including China proper, Manchuria, Mongolia, Xinjiang, and Tibet.

Background 

The Qing dynasty was established by the Manchus in 1636. In Chinese historiography, the Qing dynasty bore the Mandate of Heaven after it succeeded the Ming dynasty in 1644. In the late 19th century, wars with foreign powers led to the loss of territories and tributary states, such as Hong Kong in the First Opium War and Korea in the First Sino-Japanese War, which significantly reduced the Chinese people's trust in the empire, fueling Chinese nationalism. The sentiment was strengthened by the failed political reform, where the desire to form a constitutional monarchy resulted in the establishment of the Prince Qing's Cabinet with the majority being part of the imperial family in May 1911.

The revolutionaries aided by millions of overseas Chinese calling for a government reform continued to launch anti-Qing military campaigns in southern China, yet these campaigns were soon suppressed by the government. In October 1911, however, the uprising in Wuchang in central China caused nationwide echos, where 13 out of 18 Han-majority Chinese provinces declared independence from the empire and later established a republican government led by the revolutionary leader Sun Yat-sen. In response to the call for constitutional democracy, the Imperial Government appointed Yuan Shikai as the prime minister, yet Yuan continued to negotiate with the revolutionaries who later offered to make Yuan the first president of the Republic of China and to provide preferential treatment for the imperial family. To confront the internal pressure, Yuan ordered 50 of generals and senior officials in Beiyang Army, led by General Duan Qirui, to publish telegraphes calling for peace and threatening the imperial family. The Empress Dowager Longyu, on behalf of the Xuantong Emperor, issued the imperial edict which transferred power to the nascent Republic of China and two sequent edicts.

Drafting 
The true author of the edict is debated, but it is believed that Zhang Jian drafted the edict. However, a report on Shen-Pao, a leading Shanghai newspaper then, on 22 February 1912, titled the sad words by the empress when issuing the edict of the abdication, says that the edict was first drafted by Zhang Yuanqi, the Deputy Minister of Education, amended by Xu Shichang, shown to the Empress by Yuan Shikai on 25 January 1912. After reading the edict, the Empress was said to cry with tears streaming down, and added her own personal seal instead of the imperial seal to the edict. The personal seal of the Empress shows the four Chinese characters meaning the great way of the nature and the heaven, which suggested her scorn towards the new republic.

Content of the edict 
The full texts of the Imperial Edict of the Abdication of the Qing Emperor, in English translation and the Classical Chinese original, are as follows:

Endorsed by the Empress Dowager Longyu on behalf of the six-year-old Xuantong Emperor, the edict explicitly transferred the sovereignty over all the territories held the Qing dynasty at the time of its collapse—including China proper, Manchuria, Tibet, Xinjiang, and Mongolia—to the Republic of China.

Signatories to the edict were:

 Prime Minister of the Imperial Cabinet Yuan Shikai;
 Acting Minister of Foreign Affairs Hu Weide;
 Minister of Interior Affairs Zhao Bingjun;
 Acting Minister of Finance Magiya Shaoying;
 Minister of Education Tang Jingchong;
 Minister of the Army Wang Shizhen;
 Acting Minister of the Navy Tan Xueheng;
 Minister of Justice Shen Jiaben;
 Acting Minister of Agriculture, Works and Commerce Hitara Xiyan;
 Acting Minister of Posts and Communications Liang Shiyi;
 Minister of Feudatory Regions Affairs Dashou.

Aftermath 
The Articles of Favourable Treatment of the Great Qing Emperor after His Abdication allowed the Xuantong Emperor to retain his imperial title and enjoy other privileges following his abdication, resulting in the existence of a nominal court in the Forbidden City called the "Remnant Court of the Abdicated Qing Imperial Family" from 1912 to 1924. Feng Yuxiang revoked the privileges and abolished the titular court in 1924.

Legacy 
The edict was first collected by Zhang Chaoyong, the secretary of the cabinet, who saved it with two sequent imperial edict regarding the abdication and the 3 February edict authorising peace negotiation with the revolutionists in a single scroll. After Zhang died, the president of Beijing Normal University bought the scroll. Since 1975, the scroll has been part of the collection of the Museum of the Chinese Revolution, now known as the National Museum of China.

Related edicts 
The Xuantong Emperor issued three edicts of abdication throughout his life. The first two were issued in his capacity as Qing emperor, including that described in this article and another issued following the failure of the Manchu Restoration. The third one was issued after the Soviet invasion of Manchuria, in his capacity as Emperor of Manchukuo, a Japanese puppet state during World War II.

See also 
 1911 Revolution
 Xinhai Revolution in Xinjiang
 Xinhai Lhasa turmoil
 Mongolian Revolution of 1911
 Abolition of monarchy

Notes

References

External links 

1911 Revolution
1912 in China
Abdication
Qing dynasty
Edicts of China
Puyi
Qing dynasty Imperial Decrees